Tajikistan elects on the national level a head of state – the president – and a legislature. The president is elected for a seven-year term by the people. The Supreme Assembly (Majlisi Oli) has two chambers.  The Assembly of Representatives (Majlisi Namoyandogan) has 63 members, elected for a five-year term in, 22 by proportional representation and 41 in single-seat constituencies. The National Assembly (Majlisi Milliy) has 33 members, 25 elected for a five-year term by local majlisi deputies and eight appointed by the president.
Tajikistan is a one-party dominant system with the People's Democratic Party of Tajikistan in power.

Latest elections

2015 Parliamentary election

2013 Presidential election

2010 Parliamentary election

2006 Presidential election

2005 Parliamentary election

See also
 Electoral calendar
 Electoral system

External links
Adam Carr's Election Archive
Angus Reid